Down syndrome cell adhesion molecule like 1 is a protein in humans that is encoded by the DSCAML1 gene.

See also 
DSCAM, Down syndrome cell adhesion molecule
Fibronectin type III domain
Immunoglobulin superfamily

References

External links 
 PDBe-KB provides an overview of all the structure information available in the PDB for Human Down syndrome cell adhesion molecule-like protein 1

Further reading 

Genes on human chromosome 11